This is a list of diseases starting with the letter "A".

Aa–Ab
 Aagenaes syndrome
 Aarskog–Ose–Pande syndrome
 Aarskog syndrome
 Aase–Smith syndrome
 Aase syndrome
 Abasia
 ABCD syndrome
 Abdallat–Davis–Farrage syndrome
 Abdominal aortic aneurysm
 Abdominal cystic lymphangioma
 Abdominal defects
 Abdominal musculature absent microphthalmia joint laxity
 Abdominal neoplasm / Abdominal neoplasms
 Aberrant subclavian artery
 Ablepharon macrostomia syndrome
 Abnormal systemic venous return
 Abruzzo–Erickson syndrome
 Absence of gluteal muscle
 Absence of tibia with polydactyly
 Absent corpus callosum cataract immunodeficiency
 Absent T lymphocytes

Ac

 Acanthocheilonemiasis
 Acanthocytosis
 Acanthocytosis chorea
 Acanthosis nigricans
 Acatalasemia
 Accessory deep peroneal nerve
 Accessory navicular bone
 Accessory pancreas

Ach–Ack
 Achalasia
 Achalasia-Addisonianism-Alacrimia syndrome
 Achalasia alacrimia syndrome
 Achalasia, familial esophageal
 Achalasia microcephaly
 Achard syndrome
 Achard–Thiers syndrome
 Acheiropodia
 Achondrogenesis
 Achondrogenesis Kozlowski type
 Achondrogenesis type 1A
 Achondrogenesis type 1B
 Achondrogenesis type 2
 Achondroplasia
 Achondroplasia Swiss type agammaglobulinemia
 Achondroplastic dwarfism
 Achromatopsia
 Achromatopsia incomplete, X-linked
 Acid maltase deficiency
 Acidemia, isovaleric
 Acidemia, propionic
 Acitretine antenatal infection
 Ackerman syndrome

Acn–Acq
 Acne rosacea
 Acne vulgaris; often called acne
 Acoustic neuroma
 Acoustic schwannomas
 Acquired agranulocytosis
 Acquired central hypoventilation syndrome
 Acquired hypoprothrombinemia
 Acquired ichthyosis

 Acquired prothrombin deficiency
 Acquired syphilis

Acr

Acra
 Acral dysostosis dyserythropoiesis
 Acral renal mandibular syndrome

Acro
 Acro coxo mesomelic dysplasia

Acroc–Acrok
 Acrocallosal syndrome, Schinzel type
 Acrocephalopolydactyly
 Acrocephalosyndactyly Jackson Weiss type
 Acrocephaly
 Acrocephaly pulmonary stenosis mental retardation
 Acrocyanosis
 Acrodermatitis
 Acrodermatitis enteropathica
 Acrodysostosis
 Acrodysplasia
 Acrodysplasia scoliosis
 Acrofacial dysostosis
 Acrofacial dysostosis ambiguous genitalia
 Acrofacial dysostosis atypical postaxial
 Acrofacial dysostosis Catania form
 Acrofacial dysostosis, Nager type
 Acrofacial dysostosis, Palagonia type
 Acrofacial dysostosis Preis type
 Acrofacial dysostosis Rodriguez type
 Acrofacial dysostosis Weyers type
 Acrofrontofacionasal dysostosis
 Acrokeratoelastoidosis of Costa

Acrom–Acros
 Acromegaloid changes cutis verticis gyrata corneal
 Acromegaloid facial appearance syndrome
 Acromegaloid hypertrichosis syndrome
 Acromegaly
 Acromesomelic dysplasia
 Acromesomelic dysplasia Brahimi Bacha type
 Acromesomelic dysplasia Campailla Martinelli type
 Acromesomelic dysplasia Hunter Thompson type
 Acromesomelic dysplasia, Maroteaux type
 Acromicric dysplasia
 Acroosteolysis dominant type
 Acroosteolysis neurogenic
 Acroosteolysis osteoporosis skull and mandible changes
 Acropectoral syndrome
 Acropectorenal field defect
 Acropectorovertebral dysplasia
 Acrophobia
 Acropigmentation of Dohi
 Acrorenal syndrome recessive
 Acrorenoocular syndrome
 Acrospiroma

Act
 ACTH deficiency
 ACTH resistance
 Actinic keratosis
 Actinomycetales causes anal infection
 Actinomycosis
 Activated protein C resistance

Acu

Acut

Acuta
 Acutane embryopathy

Acute

Acute a – Acute l
 Acute anxiety
 Acute articular rheumatism
 Acute erythroblastic leukemia
 Acute febrile neutrophilic dermatosis
 Acute gouty arthritis
 Acute idiopathic polyneuritis
 Acute intermittent porphyria
 Acute lymphoblastic leukemia
 Acute lymphoblastic leukemia congenital sporadic aniridia
 Acute lymphocytic leukemia

Acute m – Acute p
 Acute megakaryoblastic leukemia
 Acute monoblastic leukemia
 Acute monocytic leukemia
 Acute mountain sickness
 Acute myeloblastic leukemia
 Acute myeloblastic leukemia, minimally differentiated
 Acute myeloblastic leukemia type 1
 Acute myeloblastic leukemia type 2
 Acute myeloblastic leukemia type 3
 Acute myeloblastic leukemia type 4
 Acute myeloblastic leukemia type 5
 Acute myeloblastic leukemia type 6
 Acute myeloblastic leukemia type 7
 Acute myeloblastic leukemia with maturation
 Acute myeloblastic leukemia without maturation
 Acute myelocytic leukemia
 Acute myelogenous leukemia
 Acute myeloid leukemia
 Acute myeloid leukemia, secondary
 Acute myelomonocytic leukemia
 Acute necrotizing ulcerative gingivitis
 Acute non lymphoblastic leukemia (generic term)
 Acute pancreatitis
 Acute posterior multifocal placoid pigment epitheliopathy
 Acute promyelocytic leukemia

Acute r – Acute t
 Acute renal failure
 Acute respiratory distress syndrome
 Acute tubular necrosis

Acy
 Acyl-CoA dehydrogenase, medium chain, deficiency of
 Acyl-CoA dehydrogenase, short chain, deficiency of
 Acyl-CoA dehydrogenase, very long chain, deficiency of
 Acyl-CoA oxidase deficiency

Ad

Ada–Adi
 Adactylia unilateral dominant
 ADAM complex
 Adams–Nance syndrome
 Adams–Oliver syndrome
 Addison's disease
 Adducted thumb club foot syndrome
 Adducted thumb syndrome recessive form
 Adducted thumbs Dundar type
 Adenine phosphoribosyltransferase deficiency
 Adenocarcinoid tumor
 Adenocarcinoma of esophagus
 Adenocarcinoma of lung
 Adenoid cystic carcinoma
 Adenoma
 Adenoma of the adrenal gland
 Adenomelablastoma
 Adenomyosis
 Adenosine deaminase deficiency
 Adenosine monophosphate deaminase deficiency
 Adenosine triphosphatase deficiency, anemia due to
 Adenylosuccinate lyase deficiency
 Adie syndrome
 Adiposis dolorosa, aka Dercum's disease

Ado–Adr
 Adolescent benign focal crisis
 Adrenal adenoma, familial
 Adrenal cancer
 Adrenal disorder
 Adrenal gland hyperfunction
 Adrenal gland hypofunction
 Adrenal hyperplasia
 Adrenal hyperplasia, congenital
 Adrenal hypertension
 Adrenal hypoplasia
 Adrenal hypoplasia congenital, X-linked
 Adrenal incidentaloma
 Adrenal insufficiency
 Adrenal macropolyadenomatosis
 Adrenal medulla neoplasm
 Adrenocortical carcinoma
 Adrenogenital syndrome
 Adrenoleukodystrophy, autosomal, neonatal form
 Adrenoleukodystrophy, X-linked
 Adrenomyodystrophy

Adu
 Adult attention deficit hyperactivity disorder
 Adult-onset Still's disease
 Adult syndrome
 Advanced sleep phase syndrome

Ae–Ah
 Aerosinusitis
 Afibrinogenemia
 African trypanosomiasis
 Agammaglobulinemia
 Aganglionosis
 Aganglionosis, total intestinal
 Aggressive fibromatosis
 Aging
 Agnathia
 Agnathia holoprosencephaly situs inversus
 Agnosia, primary visual
 Agoraphobia
 Agraphia
 Agyria
 Agyria pachygyria polymicrogyria
 Agyria-pachygyria type 1
 Ahumada-Del Castillo syndrome

Ai–Ak
 Aicardi–Goutières syndromes
 Aicardi syndrome
 Aichmophobia
 AIDS
 AIDS dementia complex
 AIDS dysmorphic syndrome
 Ainhum
 Akaba–Hayasaka syndrome
 Akesson syndrome
 Aksu–Stckhausen syndrome

Al

 Al Awadi Teebi Farag syndrome
 Al Frayh Facharzt Haque syndrome
 Al Gazali Al Talabani syndrome
 Al Gazali Aziz Salem syndrome
 Al Gazali Donnai Mueller syndrome
 Al Gazali Hirschsprung syndrome
 Al Gazali Khidr Prem Chandran syndrome
 Al Gazali Sabrinathan Nair syndrome

Ala–Alc
 Alagille–Watson syndrome (AWS)
 Alar nasal cartilages coloboma of telecanthus
 Albers–Schonberg disease
 Albinism
 Albinism deafness syndrome
 Albinism immunodeficiency
 Albinism, minimal pigment type
 Albinism, ocular
 Albinism ocular late onset sensorineural deafness
 Albinism oculocutaneous, Hermansky–Pudlak type
 Albinism, yellow mutant type
 Albinoidism
 Albrecht–Schneider–Belmont syndrome
 Albright–Turner–Morgani syndrome
 Albright's hereditary osteodystrophy
 Albright's syndrome
 Alcohol antenatal infection
 Alcohol dependence
 Alcohol fetopathy
 Alcohol withdrawal syndrome
 Alcoholic hepatitis
 Alcoholic liver cirrhosis

Ald–All
 Aldolase A deficiency
 Aldred syndrome
 Aleukemic leukemia cutis
 Alexander disease
 Alexia (acquired dyslexia)
 Alien hand syndrome
 Alkaptonuria
 Allain–Babin–Demarquez syndrome
 Allan–Herndon–Dudley syndrome
 Allanson–Pantzar–McLeod syndrome
 Allergic angiitis
 Allergic autoimmune thyroiditis
 Allergic bronchopulmonary aspergillosis
 Allergic encephalomyelitis

Alo
 Aloi Tomasini Isaia syndrome
 Alopecia
 Alopecia anosmia deafness hypogonadism syndrome
 Alopecia areata
 Alopecia congenita keratosis palmoplantaris
 Alopecia contractures dwarfism mental retardation
 Alopecia epilepsy oligophrenia syndrome of Moynahan
 Alopecia, epilepsy, pyorrhea, mental subnormality
 Alopecia hypogonadism extrapyramidal disorder
 Alopecia immunodeficiency
 Alopecia macular degeneration growth retardation
 Alopecia mental retardation hypogonadism
 Alopecia mental retardation syndrome
 Alopecia totalis
 Alopecia universalis
 Alopecia universalis onychodystrophy vitiligo

Alp–Alz
 Alpers disease
 Alpha 1-antitrypsin deficiency
 Alpha-2 deficient collagen disease
 Alpha-ketoglutarate dehydrogenase deficiency
 Alpha-L-iduronidase deficiency
 Alpha-mannosidosis
 Alpha-sarcoglycanopathy
 Alpha-thalassemia
 Alpha thalassemia abnormal morphogenesis
 Alpha-thalassemia mental retardation syndrome
 Alport syndrome
 Alport syndrome, dominant type
 Alport syndrome macrothrombocytopenia
 Alport syndrome, recessive type
 Alstrom's syndrome
 Alternating hemiplegia
 Alternating hemiplegia of childhood
 Aluminium lung
 Alveolar capillary dysplasia
 Alveolar echinococcosis
 Alveolar soft part sarcoma
 Alveolitis, extrinsic allergic
 Alves Dos Santos Castello syndrome
 Alzheimer's disease
 Alzheimer's disease, early-onset
 Alzheimer's disease, familial

Am
 Amaurosis
 Amaurosis congenita of Leber
 Amaurosis congenita of Leber, type 1
 Amaurosis congenita of Leber, type 2
 Amaurosis hypertrichosis
 Amblyopia
 Ambral syndrome
 Ambras syndrome
 Amebiasis
 Amegakaryocytic thrombocytopenia
 Amelia (birth defect)
 Amelia cleft lip palate hydrocephalus iris coloboma
 Amelia facial dysmorphism
 Amelia X linked
 Amelogenesis
 Amelogenesis imperfecta
 Amelogenesis imperfecta hypomaturation type
 Amelogenesis imperfecta local hypoplastic form
 Amelogenesis imperfecta nephrocalcinosis
 Ameloonychohypohidrotic syndrome
 Amenorrhea
 American trypanosomiasis
 Amnesia
 Amnesia, anterograde
 Amnesia, childhood
 Amnesia, dissociative
 Amnesia, drug-induced
 Amnesia, lacunar
 Amnesia, psychogenic
 Amnesia, retrograde
 Amnesia, source
 Amnesia, transient global
 Amyotrophic lateral sclerosis

An

Ana–Ane
 Anaphylaxis
 Anaplasmosis
 Anaplastic thyroid cancer
 Andersen's disease
 Andre syndrome
 Androgen insensitivity syndrome (AIS)
 Anemia
 Anemia, Diamond–Blackfan
 Anemia, hypoplastic, congenital
 Anemia, pernicious
 Anemia, sideroblastic
 Anemia sideroblastic spinocerebellar ataxia
 Anencephaly
 Anencephaly spina bifida X linked
 Aneurysm
 Aneurysm, intracranial berry
 Aneurysm of sinus of Valsalva

Ang
 Angel shaped phalangoep
 Anger irritation syndrome
 Angiofollicular lymph hyperplasia
 Angioimmunoblastic lymphadenopathy with dysproteinemia
 Angiokeratoma mental retardation coarse face
 Angiolipoma
 Angioma
 Angioma hereditary neurocutaneous
 Angiomatosis
 Angiomatosis encephalotrigeminal
 Angiomatosis leptomeningeal capillary - venous
 Angiomatosis systemic cystic seip syndrome
 Angiomyomatous hamartoma
 Angioneurotic edema hereditary due to C1 esterase deficiency
 Angiosarcoma
 Angiosarcoma of the liver
 Angiosarcoma of the scalp
 Angiostrongyliasis
 Angiotensin renin aldosterone hypertension
 Anguillulosis

Ani–Ank
 Aniridia
 Aniridia absent patella
 Aniridia ataxia renal agenesis psychomotor retardation
 Aniridia cerebellar ataxia mental deficiency
 Aniridia mental retardation syndrome
 Aniridia ptosis mental retardation obesity familial
 Aniridia renal agenesis psychomotor retardation
 Aniridia, sporadic
 Aniridia type 2
 Anisakiasis
 Ankle defects short stature
 Ankyloblepharon ectodermal defects cleft lip palate
 Ankyloblepharon filiforme adnatum cleft palate
 Ankyloblepharon filiforme imperforate anus
 Ankyloglossia heterochromia clasped thumbs
 Ankylosing spondylarthritis
 Ankylosing spondylitis
 Ankylosing vertebral hyperostosis with tylosis
 Ankylosis
 Ankylosis of teeth
 Ankylostomiasis

Ann
 Annular constricting bands
 Annular pancreas
 Annuloaortic ectasia

Ano
 Anodontia
 Anomic aphasia
 Anonychia
 Anonychia ectrodactyly
 Anonychia microcephaly
 Anonychia onychodystrophy
 Anonychia onychodystrophy brachydactyly type B
 Anophthalia
 Anophthalia pulmonary hypoplasia
 Anophthalmia
 Anophthalmia cleft lip palate hypothalamic disorder
 Anophthalmia cleft palate micrognathia
 Anophthalmia esophageal atresia cryptorchidism
 Anophthalmia megalocornea cardiopathy skeletal anomalies
 Anophthalmia microcephaly hypogonadism
 Anophthalmia plus syndrome
 Anophthalmia short stature obesity
 Anophthalmia Waardenburg syndrome
 Anophthalmos
 Anophthalmos, clinical
 Anophthalmos with limb anomalies
 Anorchia
 Anorchidism
 Anorectal anomalies
 Anorectal atresia / Ano-rectal atresia
 Anorexia nervosa
 Anorexia nervosa binge-purge type
 Anorexia nervosa restricting type
 Anorgasmia
 Anosmia
 Anotia
 Anotia facial palsy cardiac defect

Ans–Ant
 Ansell–Bywaters–Elderking syndrome
 Anterior horn disease
 Anterior pituitary insufficiency, familial
 Anterograde amnesia
 Anthrax
 Anti amnestic syndrome
 Anti-factor VIII autoimmunization
 Antigen-peptide-transporter 2 deficiency
 Anti-HLA hyperimmunization
 Antihypertensive drugs antenatal infection
 Antinolo–Nieto–Borrego syndrome
 Antiphospholipid syndrome
 Anti-plasmin deficiency
 Anti-plasmin deficiency, congenital
 Antisocial personality disorder
 Antisynthetase syndrome
 Antithrombin deficiency, congenital
 Antley–Bixler syndrome
 Anton syndrome

Ao
 Aorta-pulmonary artery fistula
 Aortic aneurysm
 Aortic arch anomaly peculiar facies mental retardation
 Aortic arch interruption
 Aortic arches defect
 Aortic coarctation
 Aortic dissection
 Aortic dissection lentiginosis
 Aortic supravalvular stenosis
 Aortic valve stenosis
 Aortic valves stenosis of the child
 Aortic window

Ap

Ape–App
 Apert like polydactyly syndrome
 Apert syndrome
 Aphalangia
 Aphalangia hemivertebrae
 Aphalangia syndactyly microcephaly
 Aphthous stomatitis
 Apiphobia
 Aplasia
 Aplasia cutis autosomal recessive
 Aplasia cutis congenita
 Aplasia cutis congenita dominant
 Aplasia cutis congenita epibulbar dermoids
 Aplasia cutis congenita intestinal lymphangiectasia
 Aplasia cutis congenita of limbs recessive
 Aplasia cutis congenita recessive
 Aplasia cutis myopia
 Aplasia/hypoplasia of pelvis, femur, fibula, and ulna with abnormal digits and nails
 Aplastic anemia
 Aplastic crisis
 Apo A-I deficiency
 Apolipoprotein C-II deficiency
 Apparent mineralocorticoid excess
 Appelt–Gerken–Lenz syndrome
 Appendicitis

Apr–Apu
 Apraxia
 Apraxia, Ideomotor
 Apraxia manual
 Apraxia, ocular motor, Cogan type
 Apudoma

Aq
 Aqueductal stenosis
 Aqueductal stenosis, X linked

Ar

Ara–Aro
 Arachindonic acid, absence of
 Arachnodactyly
 Arachnodactyly ataxia cataract aminoaciduria mental retardation
 Arachnodactyly mental retardation dysmorphism
 Arachnoid cysts
 Arachnoiditis
 Arakawa's syndrome II
 Arbovirosis
 Arc syndrome
 AREDYLD syndrome
 Argentine hemorrhagic fever 
 Arginase deficiency
 Arginemia
 Argininosuccinate synthetase deficiency
 Argininosuccinic aciduria
 Argyria
 Arhinia
 Arhinia choanal atresia microphthalmia
 Arnold–Stickler–Bourne syndrome
 Arnold–Chiari malformation
 Aromatase deficiency
 Aromatase excess syndrome
 Aromatic amino acid decarboxylase deficiency

Arr–Ars
 Arrhinia
 Arrhythmogenic right ventricular dysplasia
 Arroyo–Garcia–Cimadevilla syndrome
 Arrythmogenic right ventricular dysplasia, familial
 Arsenic poisoning

Art

Arte
 Arterial calcification of infancy
 Arterial dysplasia
 Arterial tortuosity
 Arteriovenous malformation
 Arteritis

Arth
 Arthritis
 Arthritis, juvenile
 Arthritis short stature deafness
 Arthrogryposis
 Arthrogryposis due to muscular dystrophy
 Arthrogryposis ectodermal dysplasia other anomalies
 Arthrogryposis epileptic seizures migrational brain disorder
 Arthrogryposis IUGR thoracic dystrophy
 Arthrogryposis like disorder
 Arthrogryposis like hand anomaly sensorineural
 Arthrogryposis multiplex congenita CNS calcification
 Arthrogryposis multiplex congenita distal
 Arthrogryposis multiplex congenita neurogenic type
 Arthrogryposis multiplex congenita pulmonary hypoplasia
 Arthrogryposis multiplex congenita whistling face
 Arthrogryposis multiplex congenita, distal type 1
 Arthrogryposis multiplex congenita, distal type 2
 Arthrogryposis multiplex congenita, distal, x-linked
 Arthrogryposis multiplex congenita
 Arthrogryposis ophthalmoplegia retinopathy
 Arthrogryposis renal dysfunction cholestasis syndrome
 Arthrogryposis spinal muscular atrophy

Ary
 Arylsulfatase A deficiency

As
 Asbestosis
 Ascariasis
 Ascher's syndrome
 Aseptic meningitis
 Asherman's syndrome
 Ashman phenomenon
 Aspartylglycosaminuria
 Aspergillosis
 Asperger syndrome
 Asphyxia neonatorum
 Aspiration pneumonia
 Asplenia
 Astasia-abasia
 Astasis
 Asthenia
 Asthma
 Astigmatism
 Astrocytoma
 Astrovirus infection
 Asymmetric septal hypertrophy

At
 Ataxia
 Ataxia, Marie's
 Ataxia telangiectasia
 Ataxia telangiectasia variant V1
 Atelectasis
 Atelosteogenesis type I
 Atelosteogenesis, type II
 Athabaskan brain stem dysgenesis
 Atherosclerosis
 Athetosis
 Athlete's foot
 Atopic dermatitis
 Atopic conjunctivitis
 Atopic keratoconjunctivitis
 Atresia
 Atresia of small intestine
 Atrial myxoma
 Atrial septal defect
 Atrioventricular fistula
 Atrioventricular septal defect
 Atrophic vaginitis
 Atrophoderma
 Atrophoderma of Pasini and Pierini
 Atrophy
 ATR-X
 ATR-16 syndrome
 Attention deficit hyperactivity disorder
 Attenuated FAP
 Atypical lipodystrophy

Au–Az
 Auditory processing disorder
 Aughton syndrome
 Ausems Wittebol Post Hennekam syndrome
 Autism
 Autoimmune hemolytic anemia
 Autoimmune hepatitis
 Autoimmune peripheral neuropathy
 Autoimmune polyendocrinopathy syndrome, type I
 Autonomic dysfunction
 Autonomic nervous system diseases
 Avian Flu
 Avoidant personality disorder
 Axial mesodermal dysplasia
 Axial mesodermal dysplasia spectrum
 Axial spondyloarthritis
 Axial osteomalacia
 Axial osteosclerosis
 Ayazi syndrome

Notes

A